Bala Hashtal (also Romanized as Bālā Hashtal; also known as Hashtal) is a village in Dabuy-ye Jonubi Rural District, Dabudasht District, Amol County, Mazandaran Province, Iran. At the 2006 census, its population was 472, in 116 families.

References 

Populated places in Amol County